Guandong is a Chinese town located Northeastern Pubei, Qinzhou, Guangxi, which is famous for Guandong Fish.

Pubei County
Towns of Guangxi